La mala costumbre is a single by Pastora Soler, released on 9 August 2010, for the album 15 años.

The work was written and composed by José Abraham and was dedicated to the father of Pastora Soler

The single was ranked 27th on the official Spanish chart..

Track listing 

 Digital download

 „La mala costumbre” – 4:04
 „La mala costumbre” (Dirécto) – 4:34

Chart listings

References 

2010 singles
2010 songs